Ayesha Imam is a Nigerian born human rights activist. She is a former Chief of the Culture, Gender and Human Rights department of the United Nations Population Fund and a founding member and pioneer national coordinating secretary of Women in Nigeria. She late became the coordinator of a BAOBAB for Women's Human Rights, a human rights advocacy group. Since April 2017 she serves as Chair of the Board of Directors of Greenpeace International.

Imam was involved in the successful appeal to overturn, Amina Lawal's death conviction.

Life
Imam earned a sociology bachelor's degree from Polytechnic of North London in 1980 and a master's from Ahmadu Bello University (ABU) in 1983. She completed her doctorate at University of Sussex. She joined the Ahmadu Bello University Zaria in 1980. In 1983, she was the coordinating secretary, the highest official position of Women in Nigeria, a feminist organization based in Zaria. In 1996, she co-founded BAOBAB, a women's right group that provides legal protection for women who are charged under codified Sharia penal codes, customary or secular laws that involves women but were established without the consideration of the interests of women. Such codes deals with flogging or stoning of women. As director of BAOBAB during the introduction of Sharia, the organization held seminars across the country to discuss how Muslim laws can be interpreted to support women's rights.

In a 2003 interview, Imam notes that not all laws connected to Shariah are from Qur’anic verses, but some are male interpretations of divine revelations years after the Quran was published, such interpretations include the stoning to death of a woman for adultery and amputation for theft. Therefore, she believes not all laws of the Sharia criminal code in Nigeria, especially those concerning some aspects of zina and the control of sexuality, are immutable.

In 2002, she was awarded the John Humphrey Freedom Award. Imam is a member of African Feminist Forum.

References

External links
Speech by Imam

Year of birth missing (living people)
Living people
Nigerian human rights activists
Alumni of the University of North London
Ahmadu Bello University alumni
Nigerian feminists